Karl Alexander  may refer to:

Karl Alexander, Duke of Württemberg (1684–1737), who served as Duke from 1698 until 1737
Karl Alexander, 5th Prince of Thurn and Taxis (1770–1827), the 5th Prince of Thurn and Taxis
Karl Alexander, Grand Duke of Saxe-Weimar-Eisenach (1818–1901), who served as Grand Duke from 1853 to 1901
Karl-Alexander Island, also known as Zemlya Karla-Alexandra
Karl Alexander (writer) (1938–2015), American writer and author of Time After Time

See also:
Christian Frederick Charles Alexander, Margrave of Brandenburg-Ansbach (1736–1806), commonly known as Karl Alexander
Karl Alexander Müller (born 1927), Swiss physicist and Nobel laureate
Carl Alexander  Heideloff (1789–1865), German architect